Roddlesworth is a hamlet in the parish of Withnell in Lancashire, England. It lies on the road connecting Preston with Bolton.

The name is first encountered as Rodtholfeswrtha (1160), meaning "the homestead of Hrothwulf".

See also
River Roddlesworth, a tributary of the River Darwen
The Roddlesworth Reservoirs, a chain of reservoirs on the river:
Abbey Village Reservoir
Lower Roddlesworth Reservoir
Upper Roddlesworth Reservoir
Rake Brook Reservoir, on Rake Brook, a tributary of the Roddlesworth, is often included.

Notes

External links

Villages in Lancashire
Geography of Chorley
West Pennine Moors